The Tarantula is the name of two characters appearing in media published by DC Comics.

Publication history
The original Tarantula was a character prominent in the 1940s named John Law. He first appeared in Star-Spangled Comics #1 (October 1941) and was created by Mort Weisinger and designed and drawn by cartoonist Hal Sharp. He continued in Star Spangled Comics until issue #19 (April 1943). In his initial Golden Age appearances he wore a yellow-and-purple costume that bore strong resemblance to Wesley Dodds' second Sandman costume. This was later explained in a retcon in the pages of All-Star Squadron as coming from Dodds' associate, Dian Belmont. He was assisted by his housekeeper Olga. According to Jess Nevins' Encyclopedia of Golden Age Superheroes, the Tarantula battles "the sword-wielding Blade, the cowboy thief the Outlaw and his pyrotechnic partner the Candle, the Hindu-themed Shiva, and the crime lord Sting".

The second Tarantula is Catalina Flores, who first appeared in Nightwing (vol. 2) #71 (September 2002), while waiting until issue #75 (January 2003) to appear as Tarantula; she was created by Devin Grayson.

Fictional character biography

John Law
Mystery story writer John Law was inspired to become a mystery man by the Crimson Avenger in the days after America entered World War II. The Tarantula possessed no super-abilities but relied on several gimmicks and his quick wits. He was trained in hand-to-hand combat, as well as some acrobatics, and had a passing interest in stage make-up and stage magic. He used suction cups attached to the soles on his boots to allow him to walk up walls and hang from ceilings. He used a "web-gun" (despite the fact tarantulas don't spin webs) which fired a string of fast-hardening nylon that was used to swing from one anchored point to another. 

He was a member of the All-Star Squadron before retiring to continue his writing career. He published a best-selling book, Altered Egos: The Mystery Men of World War II, sometime in the 1970s. He went on to write many other books, but none were as successful as Altered Egos.

In his later years, Law lived in the city of Blüdhaven, in the same building as Dick Grayson, known to some as the vigilante hero Nightwing. Two elderly Nazis, wanting revenge on Law, tracked him down, but were defeated by Nightwing. Law tried to spin this out as a plot for a new story, with him as the major protagonist.

Later, the building was burned down by the villain Blockbuster in an attempt to ruin Nightwing's life. John Law's successor, the new Tarantula, tried to save him, but arrived too late. John Law was presumed to have died, along with 21 other residents. However, his body was never recovered, suggesting that he survived the explosion.

Catalina Flores

Catalina Marie Flores grew up in Blüdhaven and witnessed many of the injustices that were carried out throughout the city. This prompted her to leave Blüdhaven and join the FBI in Quantico, Virginia. It is unknown how long she was an agent, but she eventually left the bureau and returned to Blüdhaven. Once there, she learned that her older brother, Assistant D.A. Mateo Flores, couldn't turn the tide of corruption that engulfed the city. She seemed to be working for the city herself when she encountered John Law, the first Tarantula, when he visited her office to get his SSI check. She had previously read a book of memoirs featuring the first Tarantula and she wanted him to sign her copy. She then wanted to know everything about John Law during his time as Tarantula.

Catalina first garnered Nightwing's attention while attending a self-defense class taught by him and she was able to deliver a blow to his body. Confident and uninhibited, she was eager to learn other various hand-to-hand defensive moves, as well as getting to know more about Grayson on less formal terms. She next caught his eye during her first outings as the second Tarantula. Nightwing was unimpressed with her extreme vigilante methods and forbade her to operate in Blüdhaven. This angered her and she took off, only to be more of a foil for Grayson down the road. During that time, Grayson was investigating the death of Delmore Redhorn, Blüdhaven's corrupt Chief of Police, and discovers evidence indicting the new Tarantula as his killer.

Working with Tad Ryerstad (Nite-Wing), Nightwing was able to have Tarantula arrested for the murder of Redhorn, although in the process the wanted vigilante Tad was arrested as well. Mateo was determined to have his sister released, angered that Catalina was arrested with the help of a dubious vigilante. After she was released, Tarantula aided Blockbuster in his revenge campaign on Nightwing. When ordered to kill Grayson's girlfriend, Barbara Gordon, she instead manipulated a dinner engagement between the two in such a manner that caused Barbara to break up with Grayson.

Things soon took a turn for the worse when Blockbuster hired other villains to attack those Grayson held dear. Tarantula was devastated as she was unable to stop a bomb explosion in Grayson's building complex that was also the home of John Law. Confronted by Lady Vic and warned not to go against Blockbuster's wishes, she shoots Vic in the chest. Seeking vengeance for John Law's demise, Tarantula helped Nightwing record Blockbuster's confession, but when she gave the tape to her brother, he crushed it because of a deal he made with Blockbuster to get her out of prison. Tarantula was out on the streets soon enough, and when the battle between Nightwing and Blockbuster heated up, Tarantula involved herself and shot Blockbuster. Nightwing could have prevented the murder, but, driven to the edge of sanity by Blockbuster's calculated assaults on everyone whom Nightwing held dear (Blockbuster knew his secret identity and exploited this), in a moment of absolute misery Nightwing stood aside and let Tarantula kill him. Afterwards, wounded and suffering a near-mental breakdown due to Blockbuster's attacks as well as his own complicity in the villain's murder, Grayson was unable to stop Tarantula from raping him where he fell. Not long after the incident, the two leave Blüdhaven, only for Tarantula to face off against  Copperhead, who was responsible for killing several local gang leaders. Grayson was able to pull it together long enough to save her from Copperhead. Strong feelings for Grayson had them try to know each other better and she persuaded him to buy a marriage license. Before Grayson could sign anything, Batman summoned him to Gotham. After the events of War Games, Nightwing came to his senses and turned in Tarantula and himself for the murder of Blockbuster. He was acquitted of his crimes, however, while Tarantula was imprisoned. 

Her fate was unknown during Infinite Crisis when the Secret Society of Super Villains released Chemo, destroying Bludhaven in the process. Later in Secret Six, she is revealed to be alive and well, but is imprisoned at Alcatraz Island. She stole a mysterious card from Junior, a mysterious crime boss who runs all of the West Coast mobs. It was later revealed that she was in possession of a "Get Out of Hell Free" card, forged by Neron. The card is coveted by Junior, who is revealed to be Ragdoll's insane sister, who sends an army of supervillains after Tarantula. She eventually sacrifices herself by pulling Junior and herself in front of a combined attack from the assembled villains, killing them both.

Later, she made an appearance in Justice Society of America as part of the resistance in an alternative future dominated by Nazis.

Controversy
At the end of Nightwing (vol. 2) #93 (July 2004), after Tarantula killed Blockbuster, she raped Nightwing on the rooftop. At the time, Nightwing was in shock and undergoing deep emotional trauma. He had also explicitly told Catalina not to touch him, but she proceeded despite this. On the subject, writer Devin Grayson made the following statement: "For the record, I’ve never used the word 'rape', I just said it was non-consensual". Grayson subsequently apologized for the comment in an interview a decade later, explicitly referring to the act as rape.

Other characters named Tarantula
The Tarantula name was used by a criminal named Mr. Crossart. He took the wealthy socialite Vivian Dale captive and ran afoul of Sandman. Tarantula was later among the villains that Ian Karkull used to fight the Justice Society of America. He was defeated by Sandman and Sandy the Golden Boy.

There is a Tarantula who is a crime lord. His minion Logger suspected that Charles McNider and Doctor Mid-Nite are the same people.

The Tarantula name was used by Franklin Lester who lost his private investigator license for unknown reasons and became a vigilante who targeted the Masher Mob. He was inspired by the Tarantula TV series that his son Gerold watched. This attracted the attention of Superman who tried to stop him from killing the two Masher Mob members. When Lois Lane stumbled upon him, Tarantula attempted to silence her only to be stopped by Superman and the ghost of a secret agent named Simon Cross. Tarantula was then handed over to the police.

The Tarantula name was also used by Roger Goldman, the former owner of the Evergood Milk Bottling Company. He became a serial killer and an enemy of Sandman.

In other media
 In the Batman: The Brave and the Bold episode "Powerless!", Aquaman is seen portraying the John Law version of Tarantula.
 The Catalina Flores version of Tarantula appears in The Lego Batman Movie as one of several villains recruited by the Joker as part of his attack on Gotham.

References

External links

Articles about multiple fictional characters
Golden Age superheroes
Comics characters introduced in 1941
Comics characters introduced in 2002
DC Comics martial artists
DC Comics superheroes
DC Comics male superheroes
DC Comics female superheroes
DC Comics supervillains
Fictional acrobats
Fictional Federal Bureau of Investigation personnel
Fictional writers
Characters created by Mort Weisinger
Fictional rapists
Dick Grayson